This list of adult industry awards is an index to articles about notable awards related to the sex industry.
The list gives the country of the awarding organization, but recipients are not necessarily limited to that country. A general list is followed by lists of gay and American pornographic films.

General

Gay pornographic films

American pornographic films

See also

 List of pornographic film awards
 List of gay pornography awards
 List of Japanese adult video awards (1991–2008)
 Lists of awards
 List of business and industry awards

References

 
Adult industry